"Another Lonely Night in New York" is a song by British singer-songwriter Robin Gibb, released in 1983 as the second single from his second solo album How Old Are You?. The song managed to chart in several countries in Europe, reaching the top 20 in Germany and Switzerland, peaking at numbers 16 and 19, respectively. It was not released in the United States as a single.

It was recorded around October to November 1982. The song's intro bears only minimal resemblance to Foreigner's 1981 hit "Waiting for a Girl Like You", before indulging in its own, time-space specific melodic structure in full force.

The song was re-recorded for Gibb's 2003 album Magnet.

Charts

References

1983 songs
1983 singles
Songs written by Robin Gibb
Songs written by Maurice Gibb
Robin Gibb songs
Polydor Records singles